Carlos Sténio Fernandes Guimarães do Carmo (born 19 March 1995), commonly known as Carlinhos, is an Angolan footballer who currently plays as a midfielder for Tanzanian club Young Africans.

Career statistics

Club

Notes

International

References

1995 births
Living people
Footballers from Luanda
Angolan footballers
Association football midfielders
Atlético Petróleos de Luanda players
G.D. Interclube players
Girabola players
Angola international footballers
Angolan expatriate footballers
Expatriate footballers in Tanzania